Embalam R. Selvam is an Indian politician. He is the current Speaker of Puducherry Legislative Assembly. He was elected to the Puducherry Legislative Assembly from Manavely as a member of the Bharatiya Janata Party.

Offices held

 
|-

References 

Bharatiya Janata Party politicians from Puducherry
Puducherry MLAs 2021–2026
Puducherry politicians
Living people
Year of birth missing (living people)